"The Power of Prayer" is a 2020 song by Bruce Springsteen from his album Letter to You. It was only released as a radio single, and a promotional video was released on November 23, a month after the release of the album.

Song facts and release
The song has a spiritual language. Springsteen was born in a Roman Catholic household, and that turned him off religion, but he didn't lose his faith. The video features archival footage from his youth and clips of Springsteen and the E Street Band working on the song in the studio. The message of the video is about old friends he’s lost and the optimism of that era, reflected in the footage of Jersey Shore in the summertime during Springsteen’s youth. The song gained radio airplay since December 4 in Italy, where it hit #1; besides radio airplay, "The Power of Prayer" reached high positions on streaming platforms: iTunes (#7) and Apple Music (#5), respectively in the United Kingdom and Norway. Surprisingly, it did not chart in the United States.

Reception
NJ.com criticized the song, describing it as too similar to the precedent song on the album, "Last Man Standing". Ultimate Classic Rock described the song negatively (as a forgettable song that could be a leftover from any Springsteen album from the past 15 years) as well. Rolling Stone'''s review was better, describing the song as a "lilting, gentle rocker, where he praises Ben E. King and the Drifters' "This Magic Moment" as an answered prayer and exclaims I’m reachin’ for heaven, we’ll make it there'' to his lover".

References

2020 songs
Bruce Springsteen songs
Song recordings produced by Bruce Springsteen
Song recordings produced by Ron Aniello
Songs written by Bruce Springsteen